Steven ("Steve") Mackey (born February 14, 1956) is an American composer, guitarist, and music educator.

Life
As a musician growing up listening to and performing vernacular American musics as well as classical music, Mackey's compositions are influenced by rock and jazz, though in an avant-garde vein.  He favors the electric guitar and frequently performs his own compositions for the instrument, which include a concerto for electric guitar and orchestra (Tuck and Roll) and two works for electric guitar and string quartet (Physical Property and Troubadour Songs).  As an electric guitar soloist, he has performed with the Kronos Quartet (Short Stories), the Arditti Quartet, New World Symphony, Dutch Radio Symphony, and London Sinfonietta.

Among Mackey's notable awards include a Guggenheim fellowship, a Charles Ives Scholarship from the American Academy and Institute of Arts and Letters, two awards from the Kennedy Center for the performing arts, and the Stoeger Prize for Chamber Music by The Chamber Music Society of Lincoln Center, the Miami performing arts center acknowledged his contributions to orchestral music with a special career achievement award, the Koussevitzky Foundation at the Library of Congress, the Fromm Foundation, the 1987 Kennedy Center Friedheim Awards, and was chosen to represent the United States in the International Composers Rostrum in Paris, France.  He also served as Composer-in-Residence at the Aspen Music Festival in 1985 among many other residencies such as Yellow barn, Imagine Festival and Bennington.  More recently, Mackey was announced Composer in Residence at Tanglewood in the summer of 2006 and was co-composer in residence with Christopher Rouse at the 2007 Aspen Music Festival.

Born in Frankfurt, Germany, 1956 to American parents, Mackey was raised in northern California.  He was graduated summa cum laude with a B.A. from the University of California, Davis, followed by an M.A. at the State University of New York at Stony Brook, and a Ph.D from Brandeis University.  Since 1985 Mackey has served as a professor of music at Princeton University, where he teaches composition, theory, twentieth century music, improvisation, and a variety of special topics.  He is also a co-director of the Princeton Composers' Ensemble and in 1991, he was awarded that university's first-ever Distinguished Teaching Award.  Mackey's music is published by Boosey & Hawkes.  His compositions have been released on the Bridge, BMG/RCA Red Seal, Albany, New World, Nonesuch, BMG/Catalyst, CRI, Min/Max, and Newport Classic labels.

References

Interviews
Steven Mackey on Steven Mackey. Documentary

Further reading
 Griffiths, Paul. 2001. "Mackey, Steve [Steven Mackey]". The New Grove Dictionary of Music and Musicians, second edition, edited by Stanley Sadie and John Tyrrell. London: Macmillan Publishers.

External links
 Steven Mackey @ Boosey & Hawkes
 Steven Mackey official site
 NewMusicBox cover: Steven Mackey in conversation with Frank J. Oteri, June 13, 2005 (includes video)

Listening
Steven Mackey interview
Art of the States: Steven Mackey two works by the composer

1956 births
Living people
20th-century classical composers
21st-century classical composers
American classical composers
American contemporary classical composers
American male classical composers
Contemporary classical music performers
University of California, Davis alumni
Stony Brook University alumni
Brandeis University alumni
Princeton University faculty
21st-century American composers
Guitarists from California
20th-century American composers
20th-century American guitarists
American male guitarists